The land comprising New York City holds approximately 5.2 million trees and 168 different tree species, as of 2020. The New York City government, alongside an assortment of environmental organizations, actively work to plant and maintain the trees. As of 2020, New York City held 44,509 acres of urban tree canopy with 24% of its land covered in trees.

History of trees in New York City 
Trees have grown continuously on the mainland and islands that now comprise New York City since the end of the Pleistocene epoch. Trees have inhabited the lands in or around what is now New York City for over 300 million years, far before the existence of humanity. The first human settlement in the NYC area is dated as early as 9,000 years ago, this marked the beginning of human's permanently altering the old-growth forest ecosystem. 

Humanity's impact of the trees in New York City greatly accelerated with European colonization of the Americas as the new settlers brought with them advanced metal tools and tree processing technologies paired with an appetite for lumber for domestic use and for export to others of the Thirteen Colonies and to the Old World. While the Native American population lived off and with the Northeastern coastal forests relatively symbiotically, the new European colonists, with their higher population density, sedentary housing needs, and agriculture techniques, diminished the need to harvest wild fruits from trees. The New World found itself rapidly deforested, New York City included.

Native American use of trees 

The Lenape peoples who inhabited the greater NYC area directly prior to European colonization relied on trees for food, shelter, tool materials, fuel, and medicine. The typical Lenape house, called a longhouse, relied on the bending of the trunks taken from small trees to create a series of arches to serve as the frame. The Lenape used the Zanthoxylum tree as medicine for toothaches because chewing on the leaves or bark creates a tingling, or numbing effect in the mouth.

In 1624, at the time of the founding of New Amsterdam, huge stands of Oak, Hickory, and Chestnut trees grew throughout the island of Manhattan. The very name "Manhattan" is recorded as originally referring to a stand of hickory trees with wood suitable for bow-making, located at the southern tip of the island. At this time, the area now known as Times Square was a Red Maple swamp. The Lenape called Governors Island: “Pagganck,” which means “nut island,” named after the areas abundance of hickory nut trees.

Native Americans made use of fire in ecosystems here as elsewhere, and some of the early Dutch colonists copied this practice.

The original forests and ecosystems of 1609 Manhattan have been reconstructed by the Wildlife Conservation Society's Mannahatta Project.

Colonial use of trees 

Fruit trees imported during the Dutch period included apple, cherry, peach and pear planted in prominent orchards.

At the corner of Cherry Street and Franklin Square, was the "Cherry Garden" planted by David Provost Sr., and later operated by the brewer Richard Sackett as "Sackett's Orchard" with a beer garden and bowling green. George Washington later lived at 1 Cherry Street, the location being notable as the nation's first presidential residence. Remnants of the orchard survived into the 1870s, when the last of the trees and Washington's home at 1 Cherry Street, were razed to build the Brooklyn Bridge.

Lumber in Manhattan during the Dutch period was largely processed at the Sawkill saw mill, worked by a settlement of enslaved Africans.

Contemporary use of trees 
In New York City, the harvesting of trees for lumber and the maintaining of orchards for fruit declined as forests and farmland was bought and developed to house the growing population of the city. Since the late 19th-early 20th century, the functions of the trees planted in the urban landscape and parks of New York City is to provide shade, help manage rainwater runoff, and clean the air by absorbing some of the carbon dioxide produced by New York City's 18+ million residents.

In an effort to maintain and improve its urban forest, New York City runs tree planting efforts through the Parks Department. As of 2020, New York City Department of Parks and Recreation is the steward of most of the 2.5+ million trees growing within New York City. The New York City Tree Map is an interactive map by the parks department that catalogues more than 850,000 trees in the city.

The NYC Department of Parks observes Earth Day and Arbor Day.

Street trees as a metaphor for urban life were popularized in the 1943 novel A Tree Grows in Brooklyn.

The tallest and oldest tree in New York City is a Tulip Poplar growing in Queens named the Queens Giant.

Old-growth forests 
Tracts of trees that have been characterized as old-growth forest include the Thain Family Forest at the New York Botanical Garden (largest in the city), as well as parts of Hunter Island in Pelham Bay Park, Midwood Forest in Prospect Park, Northwest Woods in Van Cortlandt Park, Shorakapok Preserve in Inwood Hill Park, Alley Pond Park and Forest Park. A number of the old growth forests in New York City are preserved as Forever Wild preserves.

Notable trees 
In 1985, a community nominations process led to the selection of sixty-five "Great Trees", and in the 21st century some of these were cloned through cuttings.

Notable living trees

Notable deceased trees

Trees growing in New York City 
For a full list including street trees of New York City; as well as, trees planted in New York City parks and public spaces see this article: list of tree species of New York City.

10 most common street trees in New York City

Arboreta in New York City

See also 
 list of tree species of New York City

References

External links
New York City Tree Map

Lists of trees
Trees of New York City
Environmental issues in New York City
Air pollution in New York City
History of New York City